The Wankhede Stadium (pronounced [ʋaːnkʰeɖe]) is an international cricket stadium in Mumbai, India. It is the home ground of Mumbai cricket team and IPL franchise Mumbai Indians.

This stadium is situated near the Marine drive-Arabian Sea in the Churchgate area of South Mumbai in Maharashtra.

BCCI, IPL and Mumbai Cricket Association's headquarter, Cricket centre is situated in the premises of this stadium.

The stadium now has a capacity of 33,108, following renovations for the 2011 Cricket World Cup. Before the upgrade, the capacity was approximately 45,000. By playing field area, it is one the smallest cricket grounds in the world.

Many old cricket clubs are situated near Wankhede such as Hindu Gymkhana, Parsi Gymkhana and Cricket Club of India with their respective historic grounds.

The stadium has been host to numerous high-profile cricket matches in the past, most notably the 2011 Cricket World Cup Final, in which India defeated Sri Lanka and became the first country to win the cricket world cup on home soil. The stadium played host to the last match of Sachin Tendulkar's international career. Additionally, it hosted many matches during the 1996 and 2011 Cricket World Cups. The stadium also played host to the match in which Ravi Shastri hit six sixes in an over of Tilak Raj.

History  
Early years

Mumbai has seen Test matches played at three different grounds. The Mumbai Gymkhana ground hosted the first-ever Test in India, in 1933–34 against England. After World War II, the Cricket Club of India Ltd's Brabourne Stadium – the second ground of the city – was used for 17 Tests. The Wankhede Stadium was built after disputes between the Cricket Club of India, which owns the Brabourne Stadium, and the Bombay Cricket Association (now Mumbai Cricket Association) over the allocation of tickets for cricket matches. This became severe after the Test between India and England in 1973. At the initiative of S. K. Wankhede, a politician and the secretary of the Mumbai Cricket Association, BCA built the new stadium in South Bombay (now South Mumbai) near the Churchgate station. It was built in approx. 13 months and opened in time for the final Test between India and the West Indies in 1975. Since then the Wankhede stadium has taken over from Brabourne Stadium as the main cricketing venue in the city.  It was named after Wankhede in 1974.

The Wankhede stadium staged its first Test in the 1974–75 season when the West Indies toured India. Clive Lloyd scored an unbeaten 242 and in Pataudi's last hurrah, India lost by 201 runs. The Test also featured a crowd disturbance after a fan who rushed onto the ground to greet Lloyd was treated roughly by the police. India's first victory here was posted against the New Zealand two seasons later. The stadium has been a witness to great innings like Sunil Gavaskar's 205 against the West Indies and Alvin Kallicharan's 187 in the same game in the 1978–79 series and all-round heroics like Ian Botham's century and thirteen wickets in the Jubilee Test in 1979–80, which England won by ten wickets. The highest score by an Indian at the Wankhede Stadium is Virat Kohli's 235 against England in 2016–17. Incidentally Ravi Shastri's six sixes in an over off Baroda's Tilak Raj in Ranji Trophy, en route to the fastest double-hundred in first-class cricket were recorded on this ground in 1984–85. His unbeaten 200 in 113 minutes off 123 balls with 13 fours and 13 sixes at this ground is the fastest double century in first-class cricket since the 2017–18 season when Shafiqullah Shafaq scored a double century in 89 balls.

Reconstruction 

The Wankhede Stadium was built in 1975 and the first Test match played was between India and West Indies from 23 to 28 January 1975. The Stadium was built at a time when only Test Matches were played and with the advent of One Day, Cricket and Twenty 20 Cricket, the demands of a Stadium from a spectator's point of view have totally changed.

Since ICC World Cup Cricket 2011 was to be hosted by India, Bangladesh, and Sri Lanka, and Mumbai was selected to host the final, it was decided to redevelop the Wankhede Stadium to suit the modern facilities and comfort of spectators.

The Managing Committee invited presentations from reputed Architects and shortlisted M/s. P.K. Das & Associates and M/s. Shashi Prabhu & Associates to jointly draw up a project for the redevelopment of the Wankhede Stadium. While redeveloping the Stadium, major changes were at the North end and the South end with better facilities for the spectators in terms of bucket seating, a large number of toilets, and food courts.

While MCA undertook the redevelopment of Wankhede Stadium, the ground was not available for domestic and international cricket until February 2011. In order to ensure that MCA did not miss out on the turn of Test and ODI matches and also to develop a healthy working relationship with the Cricket Club of India.

One of the highlights of the stadium is the suspended cantilever roofs. The Teflon fabric roof is lighter in weight and heat resistant. There is no beam support for the roof to ensure that the spectators will have a better view.
On the roof, there are exhaust fans that suck the hot air from the stands and allow the breeze from the West to flow in. The stadium has 20 elevators for North and South stands.

Ground facts and figures
Capacity: 33,108
Floodlights: Yes
 The WS is the home ground of Mumbai Indians team in Indian Premier League, as well as Mumbai's Ranji Trophy team.
The ground is situated near Marine Lines in Churchgate neighborhood of Mumbai. 
Board of Control for Cricket in India (BCCI) headquarters, "Cricket center" is situated near this arena.

Various format record

Test Records 
 Highest total: 631-all out by India against England in the 2016/17 season.
 Lowest total: 62 by New Zealand against India in the 2021/22 season.
 The highest partnership at the Wankhede Stadium is 298 by DB Vengsarkar and RJ Shastri for India against Australia in the 1986/87 season.
Sunil Gavaskar (1122 runs) has scored the most Test runs, followed by Sachin Tendulkar (921) and Dilip Vengsarkar (631).
Anil Kumble (38 wickets), R Ashwin (34 wickets)  and Kapil Dev (28)

ODI Records 
 Highest total: 438/4 by South Africa against India in the 2015 One Day International Series, then 358/6 by New Zealand, 299/4 by India and Sri Lanka 289/7.
 Lowest total: 115 all out by Bangladesh against India in the 1998 season.
 Sachin Tendulkar (455 runs) has scored the most ODI runs, followed by Mohammed Azharuddin (302) and Virat Kohli (249).
 Venkatesh Prasad (15 wickets), Anil Kumble (12) and Harbhajan Singh (9).

T20I Records 
 Highest total: 240/3 by India against West Indies on 11 Dec 2019
 Lowest total: 135/7 by Sri Lanka against India on 24 Dec 2017(3rd match in 3 match t20 series).
JE Root of England (131) has scored the most runs, followed by V Kohli of India (127), and CH Gayle of West Indies (104)

Stands 
Sunil Gavaskar Stand
North Stand
Vijay Merchant Stand
Sachin Tendulkar Stand
MCA Stand
Vitthal Divecha Stand
Garware Stand
Grand Stand

Cricket World Cup 

This stadium has hosted 20 One Day International (ODI) matches every time that India has hosted the Cricket World Cup:

1987 Cricket World Cup

1996 Cricket World Cup

2011 Cricket World Cup

India became the first country to win cricket world cup on homesoil at Wankhede stadium.

Other event 

 In 2014, the swearing-in ceremony of Maharashtra chief minister was held inside this arena.

In media 

 Some shots of M.S. Dhoni: The Untold Story (2016) Hindi film was filmed inside this arena.

Gallery

See also
Place names considered unusual

References

External links
Some of IPL record at the wankhede Stadium
Some of T20 record at the wankhede Stadium
 Cricinfo – Wankhede Stadium
 Wankhede Stadium Notable Events
 Cricketweb – Wankhede Stadium 
 Players, Teams statistics at Wankhede Stadium 
 MCA – Wankhede Stadium 

Cricket in Mumbai
Test cricket grounds in India
Sports venues in Mumbai
Cricket grounds in Maharashtra
1987 Cricket World Cup stadiums
1996 Cricket World Cup stadiums
2011 Cricket World Cup stadiums
Sports venues completed in 1974
1974 establishments in Maharashtra
20th-century architecture in India